Jorge Curbelo full name Jorge Winston Curbelo Garis (born 21 December 1981) is a Uruguayan footballer who plays for Arsenal de Sarandí in the Argentine Primera División. He also holds German and Argentine nationality.

Club career
Curbelo started his professional career playing with Danubio F.C. in 2002.

Curbelo was signed by Standard Liège along with his brother Juan in summer 2004.

References

External links
 Profile at Soccerway
 
 Argentine Primera statistics at Fútbol XXI

1981 births
Living people
Footballers from Montevideo
Uruguayan footballers
Uruguay international footballers
Uruguayan expatriate footballers
Association football defenders
Danubio F.C. players
Club Atlético River Plate (Montevideo) players
Defensor Sporting players
Belgian Pro League players
Standard Liège players
Real Valladolid players
Argentine Primera División players
Godoy Cruz Antonio Tomba footballers
Arsenal de Sarandí footballers
Expatriate footballers in Argentina
Expatriate footballers in Belgium